Fuzhou people (Foochow Romanized: Hók-ciŭ-nè̤ng), also known as, Foochowese, Hokchew, Hokchia, Hokchiu, Fuzhou Shiyi people, Eastern Min or Mindong refer to Chinese who originate from the Fuzhou and Mindong regions and the Gutian and Pingnan counties of Fujian province and Matsu Islands in Taiwan. Fuzhou people are a part of the Min Chinese-speaking group that speaks Eastern Min or specifically Fuzhou dialect. There is also a significant overseas Fuzhou population, particularly distributed in Malaysia, Indonesia, Japan, United States (Fuzhou Americans), Singapore and the United Kingdom.

Language

Fuzhou dialect is a tonal language that has extensive sandhi rules in the initials, rimes, and tones. These complicated rules make Fuzhou dialect one of the most difficult Chinese varieties.

Fuzhou dialects
List of dialects of the Fuzhou language:

Min county dialect 福州閩縣話 (prestige) - Fuzhou city and Minhou county.
Gutian dialect 福州古田話 - Gutian county
Ningde dialect 福州寧德話 - Ningde city and prefecture
Changle dialect 福州長樂話 - Changle district
Fuqing dialect 福州福清話 - Fuqing, Pingtan Island and parts of Changle
Matsu dialect 福州馬祖話 - Matsu islands
Minqing dialect 福州閩清話 - Minqing county

City History 
Fuzhou throughout the 1800s had many missionaries from the West coming in and out of the city. The lack of communication between government officials and local town people led to uproar among local residence regarding missionaries. Although around 1850 five major port were allowing foreigners to reside temporarily for missionary work, Fuzhounese people believed only their city was allowing this. Fuzhou natives were against missionaries as well as confronting Europeans in regards to business arrangements. At the same time Fuzhou had missionaries present, other cities such as Guangzhou started rebelling against foreigners. Daoist people as well as monks showed hospitality towards missionaries unlike most other residents. Following the lead of Guangzhou people, Fuzhounese natives soon also rebelled.  Miscommunication was a large part of misunderstanding by Fuzhounese people. During the 1800s there were five port cities that were of interest of Europeans. Shanghai and Ningbo in addition of Fuzhou, were also allowing residency for missionaries during this time. The western powers felt similar resentment towards China as China did on the West.

Education and Technology 
Throughout the Ming and Qing Dynasties, local lineages were of high importance. The success rate regarding education throughout Fuzhou was often linked to the lineage members. As part of a lineage, it was the responsibility of a community to ensure successful education occurred. Education began as a private matter and not regulated throughout different lineages. The ability for a lineage to teach the fundamentals would determine people's later success with examinations given throughout much of China. Shu-yuan were considered highly educated people who succeeded on given examinations. Many of these shu-yuan, around eighteen, were associated with Fuzhou province throughout Ming and Qing dynasty. Some of the eighteen may have been from Song dynasty. However, there is less evidence to back up those claims.

Although over time southern Fujian Province (Minnan region) is more developed in terms of technology and resources, Fujian decided on the capital Fuzhou which is in North Fujian. Fujian has had a lower rate of urbanization in comparison to China as a whole. As a result, in provinces such as Fuzhou, the locals tend to be behind on methods in regards to agriculture and technological advancements. Fujian is rich in their ability to fish due to their location along the coastline. Fuzhou can not only participate in fishing itself but also the transporting of goods along the sea. Due to the richness of resources, the desire for migration to Fuzhou is high. As a result, people desiring to move to Fuzhou must have high education levels as well as skills necessary to contribute to the society.

Emigration and diaspora

History
Fuzhou's history of emigration began since the Ming dynasty with Zheng He's voyages overseas. As the result of immigration of Fuzhounese to southeast Asia, Fuzhou dialect is found in Singapore, Malaysia and Indonesia. The city of Sibu of Malaysia is called "New Fuzhou" due to a large wave of Fuzhounese immigration in the early 1900s. They are referred to as "Hockchiu" or "Hokchew" in Singapore and Malaysia.

Japan 
Some Fuzhou people have moved to Japan. Conversely, many Japanese have historically been interested in Fuzhou language. During the Second World War, some Japanese scholars became passionate about studying Fuzhou dialect, believing that it could be beneficial to the rule of the Greater East Asia Co-Prosperity Sphere. One of their most famous works was the Japanese-Chinese Translation: Fuzhou Dialect published in 1940 in Taipei, in which katakana was used to represent Fuzhou pronunciation.

Southeast Asia
The Hockchius and Hockchias migrated to Nanyang (South-East Asia) in much smaller numbers compared to the Hokkien, Cantonese, Hakkas and Hainanese but achieved remarkable success. Amongst others, Robert Kuok (Hockchiu) rose to become the "Sugar King" of Malaysia and is currently ranked the richest man in South-East Asia whereas Liem Sioe Liong (Sudono Salim) who was of Hockchia origin, was once the richest man in Indonesia, controlling a vast empire in the industry of flour, cement and food manufacturing.

United States

Fuzhounese people first started immigrating to America during the late Qing dynasty. Some of these immigrants were students who, after completing their studies returned to back to their fatherland (Fuzhou).

However, after the USA passed the 1882 Chinese Exclusion Act, immigration from China to the USA stopped for nearly a century. Only in 1980s with the China-USA détente and subsequent reform and opening, a wave of Fuzhounese settled in America. These new Fuzhounese immigrants set up their own separated communities such as "Little Fuzhou" in Manhattan.

Notable Fuzhou people

Scientists, mathematicians and inventors
Chen Jingrun, a widely known mathematician who invented Chen's theorem and Chen prime.
Yan Fu, a Chinese scholar and translator, best known for introducing western ideas such as Darwinian evolution.
Chih-Tang Sah, Graduate Research Professor at the University of Florida, USA from 1988. Professor of Physics and Professor of Electrical and Computer Engineering.
Hou Debang, a chemical engineer.
Hsien Wu, a Chinese protein scientist who was the first to propose that protein denaturation was a purely conformational change, corresponded to protein unfolding and not to some chemical alteration of the protein.
Ray Wu, (born in Beijing) his son; A Chinese-American geneticist and pioneer of plant genetic engineering
Zhang Yuzhe, a Chinese astronomer who is widely regarded as the father of modern Chinese astronomy.
Chia-Chiao Lin, a mathematician and Institute Professor emeritus at the Massachusetts Institute of Technology.
Tung-Yen Lin, a structural engineer who was the pioneer of standardizing the use of prestressed concrete.
Deng Xuquan, a scientist specialising in microbiology, he served in many universities as both a researcher and lecturer.
Wang Shizhen, Father of Chinese nuclear medicine.
Wu Mengchao, widely considered to be the Father of Chinese Hepatobiliary Surgery, for his achievements he was awarded China's highest scientific prize in 2005 by President Hu Jintao. 
Guo Kexin, an important Chinese physicist, metallurgist and crystallographer who is considered as the main pioneer of electron microscopy of China.
Liu Yingming, a mathematician and academician.
Sun Shensu, a geochemist and PhD holder from the Columbian University (1973).
Chen Zhangliang, a Chinese biologist, elected as vice-governor of Guangxi in 2007.
Min Zhuo, a famous pain neuroscientist at the University of Toronto in Canada, he won many prestigious awards for his outstanding scientific achievements.

Politicians and revolutionaries
Shen Song, a chancellor of the state Wuyue during the Five Dynasties and Ten Kingdoms Period.
Chen Di, famous Ming era philologist, strategist and traveler.
Lin Zexu, a prominent Chinese scholar and official, widely regarded as a Chinese national hero for his strong opposition to the trade of opium before the First Anglo-Chinese War.
Shen Baozhen, Viceroy of Liangjiang from 1875 to 1879.
Chen Baochen (陈宝琛, 1848 - 1935), Chinese scholar and loyalist to the Qing dynasty.
Wong Nai Siong, a Chinese revolutionary leader and Christian scholar.
Chen Jitong, Chinese diplomat, general and scholar during the late Qing dynasty.
Lin Shu, Chinese scholar and translator, noted for his translation of Alexandre Dumas and La Dame aux Camélias.
Liu Buchan (劉步蟾, 1852－1895), naval officer of the Beiyang Fleet, the most prominent of China's naval units in the late Qing dynasty.
Sa Zhenbing (萨镇冰, 1859–1952), high-ranking naval officer of Mongolian origin.
Zheng Xiaoxu, Chinese statesman, diplomat and calligrapher.
Liu Guanxiong, Chinese Admiral who was Navy Minister of China, from 1912 to 1916 and 1917–1919.
Lin Sen, President of the Republic of China from 1931 to 1943.
Chin Ping (陈平), OBE, the Former leader of the Malayan Communist Party, ancestral hometown was Fuzhou.
Lin Xu (林旭, 1875 - 1898), Chinese politician, scholar, songwriter and poet who lived in the late Qing dynasty.
Du Xigui (杜錫珪, 1875 - 1933), Chinese admiral during the warlord era.
Lin Changmin (:zh:林長民, 1876–1925), a high-rank governor in the Beiyang Government.
Lin Juemin (林觉民, 1887 - 1911), Chinese revolutionary, member of Tongmenghui in Japan.
Chen Shaokuan (陳紹寬, 1889–1969), Fleet Admiral who served as the senior commander of naval forces of the National Revolutionary Army.

Writers and poets
Ingen, well known Buddhist monk, poet and calligrapher who lived during Ming dynasty.
Lin Huiyin, female architect and poet, daughter of Lin Changmin (:zh:林長民).
Zou Taofen, Chinese patriot, journalist, media entrepreneur, and political activist.
Zheng Zhenduo, a Chinese journalist and literary scholar.
Zhu Qianzhi, a Chinese intellectual, translator and historian.
Bing Xin, a female Chinese writer.
Hu Yepin, left wing writer.
Zheng Min, Chinese scholar and poet.
Wang Wenxing, Chinese American writer.
Watchman Nee, a Chinese Christian author and church leader.

Businessmen
Liem Sioe Liong, a Chinese Indonesian billionaire businessman and founder of Salim Group
Robert Kuok, a Malaysian billionaire businessman and chairman of Shangri-La Hotels and Resorts
Surya Wonowidjojo (Tjoa Ing-hwie), the founder of Gudang Garam, the largest cigaret producer in Indonesia.
Rachman Halim, second CEO of Gudang Garam.
Tiong Hiew King, a Malaysian Executive Chairman of Rimbunan Hijau, Timber tycoon and Chinese Media proprietor.
Tiong Thai King, a Malaysian politician and businessman, Member of the Malaysian Parliament for Lanang, Sibu, Sarawak from 1995 to 2013.
Alim Markus, Indonesian businessman from East Java.

Others
Go Seigen, a Weiqi/Go player, considered by many players to be the greatest player of the game in the 20th century and one of the greatest of all time.
Jahja Ling, a famous Orchestra conductor.
Lin Yaohua, famed Chinese sociologist and anthropologist.
Nicholas Kao Se Tseien, one of the oldest Catholic priest in China and Hong Kong.
Cheng Nan-jung, a Taiwanese publisher and pro-democracy activist.
Lin Chi-ling, a Taiwanese model, actress, singer and television host.
Ludi Lin, an actor who starred in the 2017 Power Rangers.
Daniel Bambang Dwi Byantoro, an Indonesian Greek Old Calendarist archimandrite and founder of the decanate Indonesia Orthodox Church.

See also
 Fuzhou, the homeland of Fuzhou people.
 Fuzhou dialect, the native mother tongue of Fuzhou people and Sinitic language.
 Fuzhou Americans, a portion of the Fuzhounese diasopa.

References 

Ethnic groups in Fujian
Ethnic groups in China
Ethnic groups in Malaysia
Subgroups of the Han Chinese